Onnu Kure Áyiram Yogam (Malayalam:ഒന്നു കുറെ ആയിരം യോഗം), also called OKAY, is an association of members of the Nair society in the Kodungallur region of Kerala state, India. Literally Onnu Kure Áyiram Yogam means an association of one minus one thousand. The yogam (association) was an organisation of Nairs of the region and various sub classes of the Nair community had representations in the yogam.

The members of the yogam were the administrators of the Kodungallur Bhagavathy Temple. The yogam used to be held on the first day of every month before the Kodungallur Bhagavathy temple and considered all matters pertaining to the subjects who are within their jurisdiction and took appropriate decisions.

History 

The yogam was once a military force under the Cheraman Perumals (kings of Chera dynasty) composed of one thousand people including the Perumal (the Chera king).

Even after the end of Chera dynasty in the early 12th century, the organization continued to exist; but they decided not to fill the absence of the Chera kings. Hence the number shrank to nine hundred and ninety nine and the yogam became known by its present name.

Today, the organisation is usually referred to by its acronym, OKAY. Even after the end of the Perumal reign, when the Kodungallur Royal Family took over the administration in the region, the yogam and the kings used to meet and take joint decisions on the administration of the temple on the first day of every month (Kollam Era). They also performed a ritual called Nizhalirikkal, after Pantheeradi Puja, at the east gate of the temple in continuation of the summit . Nizhalirikkal was a committee on administration of the temple which had a quorum of 32 members. Pantheeradi (twelve feet) Puja (worship) is one of the daily puja rituals performed in Kerala temples when the shadow reaches 12 feet of length.

Present day operations 

Today the yogam directly administers the functions of the temple on important dates. For example, it administers the functions on the first day of the Thálappoli festival which is a four-day festival being held in January each year. It also funds various community activities.

References 

Nair
History of Kerala